1289 Kutaïssi is a stony Koronian asteroid from the outer region of the asteroid belt. Discovered by Grigory Neujmin at Simeiz Observatory in 1933, it was later named after the Georgian city of Kutaisi.

Discovery 

Kutaïssi was discovered on 19 August 1933, by Soviet astronomer Grigory Neujmin at Simeiz Observatory on the Crimean peninsula. It was independently discovered a few days later by Eugène Delporte at the Belgian Uccle Observatory on 25 August, as well as by Cyril Jackson at the South African Johannesburg Observatory on 11 September 1933.

Orbit and classification 

Kutaïssi is a stony member of the Koronis family, a group consisting of about 200 known bodies, thought to have been formed at least two billion years ago in a catastrophic collision between two larger bodies. It orbits the Sun in the outer main-belt at a distance of 2.7–3.0 AU once every 4 years and 10 months (1,766 days). Its orbit has an eccentricity of 0.06 and an inclination of 2° with respect to the ecliptic.

Naming 

This minor planet was named after the city of Kutaisi, now the legislative capital of Georgia, and its second largest city, after the capital Tbilisi. The official naming citation was first mentioned in The Names of the Minor Planets by Paul Herget in 1955.

Physical characteristics 

Kutaïssi is a common stony S-type asteroid in the Tholen classification.

Rotation period 

The first rotational light curve of Kutaïssi was obtained from photometric observations by American astronomer Richard Binzel in February 1984. It gave a rotation period of 3.60 hours with a brightness variation of 0.40 magnitude.

Diameter and albedo 

According to the surveys carried out by the Infrared Astronomical Satellite IRAS, the Japanese Akari satellite, and NASA's Wide-field Infrared Survey Explorer with its subsequent NEOWISE mission, Kutaïssi measures between 19.20 and 25.62 kilometers in diameter, and its surface has an albedo between 0.1374 and 0.245. The Collaborative Asteroid Lightcurve Link derives an albedo of 0.1216 and a diameter of 25.53 kilometers based on an absolute magnitude of 10.87.

References

External links 
 Lightcurve Database Query (LCDB), at www.minorplanet.info
 Dictionary of Minor Planet Names, Google books
 Asteroids and comets rotation curves, CdR – Geneva Observatory, Raoul Behrend
 Discovery Circumstances: Numbered Minor Planets (1)-(5000) – Minor Planet Center
 
 

001289
Discoveries by Grigory Neujmin
Named minor planets
001289
19330819